John Ronald Hamilton (1871–1940) was a New Zealand politician of the Reform Party.

Hamilton was born in 1871 in Forest Hill in Southland, where he received his education. He later moved to the nearby Winton. He was the elder brother of Adam Hamilton.

In 1935, Hamilton was awarded the King George V Silver Jubilee Medal.

References

1871 births
1940 deaths
Reform Party (New Zealand) MPs
New Zealand people of Scottish descent
Members of the New Zealand House of Representatives
New Zealand MPs for South Island electorates
Unsuccessful candidates in the 1928 New Zealand general election
Unsuccessful candidates in the 1911 New Zealand general election
Unsuccessful candidates in the 1914 New Zealand general election
Unsuccessful candidates in the 1922 New Zealand general election